Mir Ahmad (also Romanized as Mīr Ahmad and Mīr Aḩmad; also known as Mīr Aḩmadī) is a village in Donbaleh Rud-e Jonubi Rural District, Dehdez District, Izeh County, Khuzestan Province, Iran. At the 2006 census, its population was 703, in 138 families.

References 

Populated places in Izeh County